Hallingea is a genus of fungi in the Gallaceaceae family. The genus contains three species found in South America.

References

External links

Hysterangiales
Fungi of South America
Agaricomycetes genera